La Mode Pratique was a weekly French fashion magazine founded by Caroline de Broutelles in 1891, and published until 1951 by Paris publisher Librairie Hachette et Cie. In 1892, it became the first magazine worldwide to feature fashion photography.

It was subsequently translated and published in English in London by under the name Fashions of To-day by Sampson Low, Marston & Company

References 

Fashion magazines